KIAA1530 is a protein that in humans that is encoded by the KIAA1530 gene, also known as UVSSA. Mutations in this gene have been identified to cause the UV-sensitive syndrome and recently, its important role in Transcription-coupled repair has been identified.

Clinical relevance
Mutations in this gene cause UV-sensitive syndrome.

References

Further reading